The Northwest Philatelic Library is based in Portland, Oregon.

History 
The library was originally established as the Harold Peterson Philatelic Library, part of the Oregon Stamp Society. In 2003 it became a separate legal entity in its own right as the Northwest Philatelic Library, Inc.

Governance 
The library is governed and managed by a volunteer Executive Board of three officers and four directors-at-large.

The collection 
The collection comprises over 3000 books and around 200 philatelic journals.

Journal 
The library publishes a journal, Book Reports.

References

External links 
Official website.
Library catalogue.

Philatelic libraries
Libraries in Portland, Oregon